The Now Now is the sixth studio album recorded by the British virtual band Gorillaz, released on 29 June 2018 via Parlophone and Warner Bros. Records. Recording for the album began in late 2017 – according to Gorillaz co-creator Damon Albarn, it was recorded quickly so the band would have new material to play at future concerts.

The album spawned six singles, including "Humility" (the lead single), "Hollywood" and "Tranz". The Now Now debuted at number four on the Billboard 200 and at number five on the UK Albums Chart. It received generally positive reviews from critics, who praised the album's minimalist sound and lyrical content  however, some reviewers criticised its perceived lack of ambition and focus.

Background and recording
Following the release of their 2017 album Humanz, the co-creator of Gorillaz, Damon Albarn, had hinted at the possibility of a new Gorillaz album arriving sooner than expected, and said he enjoyed recording and debuting new music while on tour. He compared the spontaneous nature of this process to their 2010 album The Fall and wanted to make another record that would feel similar but more complete in comparison; he said, "if we're going to do more with Gorillaz we don't want to wait seven years because ... we're getting on a bit now". He later confirmed Gorillaz were working on another album that was scheduled for release in 2018.

New songs from the album were performed during the Humanz Tour; Gorillaz debuted "Idaho" during a September 2017 concert in Seattle. In March 2018, during a concert in Santiago, the band debuted "Hollywood", which features Jamie Principle and Snoop Dogg. At this concert, Albarn stated the album had recently been finished and would soon be released. That May, a series of posters that contained phrases such as "G is the Magic Number" and "Save Us from Him" – as well as a URL that pointed to a teaser for the album that revealed its title and release date – were found at the music festival All Points East. The website included a short excerpt from a new song that was later released as "Lake Zurich". On 28 May, the day after the festival ended, Emma de Caunes, the wife of Gorillaz co-creator Jamie Hewlett, confirmed the album's release via Instagram.

Recording began during the North American leg of the Humanz Tour in late 2017, but the majority of the album was recorded in February 2018 at Studio 13 in London. In a Radio X interview, Albarn said the album was produced within a short time so the band would have new material to play at upcoming festivals. As a byproduct of the album's expedited production, The Now Now includes fewer guest collaborators than previous Gorillaz records. Albarn credited producer James Ford for extensively contributing to the album's lyrical cohesion, saying; "If this record makes any more sense, it's entirely down to him, not me".

Music and lyrics

According to Stephen Thomas Erlewine of AllMusic, The Now Now includes elements of 1980s new wave and "yacht soul", which suggest the influence of disco and old-school hip-hop in Albarn's songwriting. Clash magazine described its songs as "slick, mutant funk", while Drowned in Sound noted a "breezy synth-pop style" that it compared with Gorillaz' earlier album Plastic Beach. NMEs Thomas Smith called Albarn's lyrics "more introspective" as a result of "[moving] away" from the "bad influences" of 2017's Humanz. Pitchfork described the album as "daydream funk, playful psych-pop, and up-scale disco". Corbin Reid of Uproxx said, "Stuttering synth melodies lock into and swirl around an impressive collection of different and varying drum patterns. The music doesn't knock you down as much as it washes over you like a warm, comforting wave." He also compared it to the music of Tame Impala, noting it is "maybe less psychedelic in execution and more sepia-tinged in feeling". Lily Moayeri from Under the Radar  said many of the lyrics are "set in or devoted to the city of Los Angeles", adding "The Now Now gives off the impression of a tour diary". Finn from DIY called the album "A more spaced-out affair, stripped of its star-studded collaborations and bathed in the apparent apathy of the modern age".

Release and promotion
The Now Now was officially announced on 30 May 2018. The following day, a North American seven-date tour  to promote the album beginning in October, which was part of The Now Now Tour, was announced. On 24 June, Gorillaz performed The Now Now live at the Boiler Room in Tokyo, Japan, streaming it live on YouTube.

When songs from the album  excluding "Humility" and "Tranz", both of which had music videos  were released, visualisers for them were uploaded to YouTube.

Singles
On 31 May 2018, the songs "Humility", which debuted via Zane Lowe's Beats 1 radio program, and "Lake Zurich", which peaked at 35 on the US Hot Rock Songs chart, were released as singles.

"Humility" had been announced the previous day; it was released with a music video, in which the fictional lead singer of Gorillaz, 2-D is seen roller-skating around Venice Beach. "Humility" peaked at 81 on the UK Singles Chart, at 85 on the US Billboard Hot 100 and at number 7 on the US Hot Rock Songs chart. On 7 June, the album's third single "Sorcererz" was released. The song was originally premiered during Gorillaz's headlining set at Rock im Park. It peaked at 36 on the US Hot Rock Songs chart.

On 14 June, the fourth single, "Fire Flies", was released; it peaked at 32 on the US Hot Rock Songs chart. On 21 June, the fifth single "Hollywood" was released. The song was first heard at a concert in Santiago, Chile. Before the song began, Albarn said to the crowd, "If you go tell anyone that we're putting out a new album very soon, I'll deny it, cause I didn't say that. Alright?". "Hollywood" peaked at 26 on the US Hot Rock Songs chart. On 14 September, the sixth single "Tranz" was released with a music video, which, according to Sam Moore of NME, "depicts the cartoon version of the band's first-ever 'live performance' music video". The song peaked at 16 on the US Hot Rock Songs chart.

Reception

Critical reception 
The Now Now received generally positive reviews from music critics. Review aggregator website Metacritic, which assigns a normalised rating out of 100 to reviews from mainstream critics, assigned the album an average score of 73, based on 28 reviews, indicating "generally favorable reviews".

The album, which is a comparably stripped-down affair, was praised for its lyrical and musical simplicity. In his review, NMEs Thomas Smith called it a "trim and spritely listen". According to Rolling Stones Will Hermes, the simplistic approach results in "the band's most coherent LP to date". Many reviewers compared The Now Now with the band's previous two records. Favourably commenting on the new-found coherence reminiscent of The Fall, Drowned in Sounds Duncan Conrad noted the "radically shortened guest list" and the "written-on-the-road simplicity" that are more akin to the band's 2010 fan club giveaway than the "over-stuffed" Humanz. NMEs Smith lauded the album as more concise and less "generic" than its "bloated" immediate predecessor. DIYs Rachel Finn said the album feels "easy to just sit back and listen".

Most critics also praised the album's energy and optimism. According to NME, The Now Now consists of "11 pop tracks that zip with energy, passion and an abundance of ideas", Rolling Stone called it "optimistic by [Albarn's] usual standards". Among others, Clashs Wilf Skinner called it "a jubilant and solidly varied ... album".

Some critics felt that there was a lack of ambition on the album. Rolling Stone said there is a distinct lack of "the sparks that come from the usual Gorillaz mess of ideas and personalities". Drowned in Sound called it a "disappointingly minor album, low on standout songs and big ideas", and lacking the band's trademark experimentation.

Critics were also divided on the album's narrative. While Drowned in Sounds Conrad said the album "does very little to advance the mythology [of the band]" and thus "lacks a sense of purpose", NME said its narrative "works in tandem with their current storyline" to the band's "highly entertaining mythology".

GQ in Russia ranked The Now Now as the 18th best album of 2018.

Commercial reception
The Now Now debuted at number five on the UK Albums Chart, becoming Gorillaz' sixth album to reach the chart's top ten. In the United States, The Now Now debuted at number four on the US Billboard 200 with sales of 63,000 album-equivalent units, of which 52,000 were pure album sales, becoming Gorillaz' fifth top-ten album in the United States.

Track listing
All tracks are written by Damon Albarn, alongside any featured artists, and produced by Gorillaz, James Ford, and Remi Kabaka.

Personnel
Credits adapted from the liner notes.

Gorillaz
 Damon Albarn – vocals, instrumentation, production 
 Jamie Hewlett – artwork, design, video direction
 Junior Dan – bass 
 Stephen Sedgwick – mixing, engineering, recording
 Karl Vanden Bossche – percussion 
 Remi Kabaka Jr. – production, percussion, drum programming 
 John Davis – mastering
 Samuel Egglenton – engineering assistance
 James Ford – production , drums, bass guitar , synthesiser 

Additional musicians
 George Benson – guitar 
 Snoop Dogg – vocals 
 Jamie Principle – vocals 
 Abra – additional vocals 
 Graham Coxon – additional guitar 

Additional technical
 Mark DeCozio – additional engineering 
 Stuart Lowbridge – live music co-ordination

Additional artwork
 Stars Redmond – assistance
 Siobhan Battye – assistance

Charts

Weekly charts

Year-end charts

Certifications

Notes

References

2018 albums
Gorillaz albums
Parlophone albums
Warner Records albums
Albums produced by Damon Albarn
Albums produced by James Ford (musician)
Albums recorded at Studio 13